By the Numbers is an album of covers performed by The Postmarks, released in 2008.

Track listing

"One Note Samba" (Antonio Carlos Jobim)- 3:05
"You Only Live Twice" (Nancy Sinatra) - 2:57
"Three Little Birds" (Bob Marley) - 3:51
"OX4" (Ride)- 4:56
"Five Years" (David Bowie) - 4:19
"Six Different Ways" (The Cure)- 4:15
"7-11" (The Ramones) - 3:40
"Eight Miles High" (The Byrds) - 4:15
"Nine Million Rainy Days" (The Jesus & Mary Chain) - 3:57
"Slaughter on Tenth Avenue" (Richard Rodgers) - 2:27
"11:59" (Blondie) - 3:47
"Pinball Number Count" (The Pointer Sisters) - 2:13

Personnel
 Tim Yehezkely - Vocals, Instrumentation
 Christopher Moll - Guitar, Vocals, Instrumentation
 Jon Wilkins - Drums, Instrumentation
 Jeff Wagner - Piano, Organ, Moog Synthesizer
 Brian Hill - Bass

References

2008 albums
The Postmarks albums